"Serengeti" is a song by the Danish dance-pop duo Infernal. It was released as the lead single from their second studio album, Waiting for Daylight, in 2000.

Track listings

Credits and personnel
Written by Infernal, De La Ray, Moses Malone
Produced and arranged by Infernal and De La Ray
Mixed at Infernal Studio
Vocals by Paw, Moses Malone
All instruments by Infernal, De La Ray
Additional vocal production by Michael Pfundheller
Mastered by Michael Pfundheller at Flex Studio
Executive producer: Kenneth Bager
"Electric Midnight": written, produced and arranged by Infernal
"Serengeti" (Azzido Mix): remixed by Infernal and Kenneth Bager
"Serengeti" (Double T Exotic Club Mix): remixed by Kjeld Tolstrup and Morten Trøst. Additional keyboards by Sune Kempf. Mixed at Sunzet Studio
"Serengeti" (Orchestral World Groove Dub): remixed by Pathaan and Gaudi. Mixed at Metatron Studio London

References

2000 singles
Infernal (Danish band) songs
2000 songs
Songs written by Lina Rafn
Songs written by Paw Lagermann